Lee Stephen (born 29 October 1975) is a Saint Lucian cricketer. He played in two first-class and two List A matches for the Windward Islands in 1996/97.

See also
 List of Windward Islands first-class cricketers

References

External links
 

1975 births
Living people
Saint Lucian cricketers
Windward Islands cricketers